México is a 2015 studio album of Spanish international singer Julio Iglesias released on Sony Music. It reached number 1 on Productores de Música de España (PROMUSICAE) Official Albums Chart. It also charted in a great number of European chart. The single "Fallaste corazón", a cover of Pedro Infante hit was also a charting single in Spain.

Track listing
"Usted" (3:28)	
"Júrame" (4:07)	
"Ella" (3:46)	
"Fallaste corazón" (4:00)	
"Sway" (3:30)	
"Amanecí en tus brazos" (3:17)	
"Échame a mí la culpa" (Version 2015) (3:32)	
"Juan Charrasqueado" (3:45)	
"Y nos dieron las diez" (4:48)	
"La media vuelta" (3:18)	
"Se me olvidó otra vez" (3:01)	
"México lindo" (2:46)	
"Quién será" (Bonus Track) (2:43)

Charts

Certifications

See also
List of number-one albums of 2015 (Spain)

References

2015 albums
Julio Iglesias albums
Covers albums
Spanish-language albums
Sony Music albums